The velvety black tyrant (Knipolegus nigerrimus) is a species of bird in the family Tyrannidae. It is endemic to Brazil, where its natural habitats are temperate forests, subtropical or tropical moist montane forests, and subtropical or tropical high-altitude shrubland.

References

External links

Velvety black tyrant videos on the Internet Bird Collection
Photo-High Res; Article tropicalbirding
Velvety black tyrant photo gallery VIREO

Knipolegus
Birds of the Atlantic Forest
Endemic birds of Brazil
Birds described in 1818
Taxa named by Louis Jean Pierre Vieillot
Taxonomy articles created by Polbot